John Briggs (27 October 1924 – October 1992) was an English professional footballer who played as a left winger for Gillingham between 1946 and 1953.

References

1924 births
1992 deaths
English footballers
Footballers from Barnsley
Association football wingers
Gillingham F.C. players
British Army personnel of World War II